Rainer Schmidt (born 1954) is a German landscape architect, urban designer, and professor of landscape architecture at the Beuth University of Applied Sciences Berlin. Rainer operates out of three German offices located in Munich, Berlin, and Bernburg. His international work specializes in large scale projects in landscape architecture, environmental planning and urban design. To date, his projects are found in places such as in Germany, Austria, China, Algeria and the Middle East.

Life and career

Schmidt was born in Gelsenkirchen, Germany, and had practiced in gardening and landscaping from 1972 to 1975. This inspired him to pursue an education in landscape architecture from 1975 to 1980 at the Hochschule Weihenstephan in Freising, Germany.

After graduating in 1980, Schmidt began his career as a landscape architect in the office of Gottfried Hansjakob where he progressed towards Senior Landscape Architect and line manager. Since 1986, he has been registered as a Landscape Architect by the Bavarian Chamber of Architects. In 1991, Schmidt started his own office "Rainer Schmidt Landscape Architects and Urban Planners" and followed the call for professorship in "Landscape Architecture" at the Beuth University of Applied Sciences, Berlin, Germany. Schmidt has also taught under Guest Professorship at the University of California Berkeley, USA, in 2007 and the University of Beijing, China, in 2004. Since 2005, Schmidt is a member of the advisory board of the German Society of Garden Architecture and Landscape Culture, Berlin, Germany (DGGL). Since 2008, Schmidt has been registered by the Bavarian Chamber of Architects as an urban planner.

Company profile

Philosophy 
According to his philosophy of ‘working from place’, landscape architecture in the 21st century is supposed to reflect the relationship between humans and nature. Schmidt conceptualizes each project holistically. From idea to concept to implementation ..., he considers process and product and communicates this with his employees. The outcome is about making a project, an area, a place ‘radiate’. In order to achieve this quality, a situation is to be structurally understood and structurally transformed during the working process. According to this systematic approach, landscape architecture and design are worked on as concepts and not as decoration. The necessary syntheses of ecology and of “healthy living conditions” – for the human and for nature – are integrated parts of these spatial concept-findings, considered as the basis for intervening into ‘nature by culture’.

Concept-finding 
The concepts are structures for building space three-dimensionally, texturally and materially. They tell the story of place in an innovative way and apply contemporary ideas for continuing the tradition of culture in place. They generate atmosphere and change the human perception of space and of nature. Each task definition is taken through a process of design consideration which enfolds options and determines a finally optimized decision as result of a strict cooperation with client, user and cost management. The firm's overall aims are to renew continuously the human scale and to bring nature close to people. This is bound to strong concepts for planting design, to an innovative selection of plants and material and to a vision for the aimed to atmosphere of the space to be created – which will make the user become active in feeling and occupying the space. The specific desire is to conceptualise and build the next large public park, if necessary as a temporary park, preparing for urban development, urban gardening and biodiversity, integrating the ‘third landscape’ and counter-balancing the damages left from industrialisation processes.

Awards 

2017 Firm of the Year, American Architecture Award in Urban Design
2016 American Architecture Prize, Silver Prize Winner, "Park Killesberg, Stuttgart, Germany"
2015 WAN Landscape Award, 1. Preis, "Park Killesberg, Stuttgart, Germany"
2013 DGNB Gold Certification, for the project "Think K- Forum K, Stuttgart, Germany“
2009 BDLA Prize, for the project "Villa Heldmann Garden, St. Gilgen, Austria"
2008 Premio Internazionale Torsanlorenzo for the project "Villa Heldmann Garden, St. Gilgen, Austria"
2008 Premio Internazionale Torsanlorenzo for the project "Paulinum Grammar School, Schwaz, Austria"
2006 Premio Internazionale Torsanlorenzo for the project "Federal Garden Exhibition – BUGA, Munich, Germany"
2006 Premio Internazionale Torsanlorenzo, for the project "Bavarian National Museum, Munich, Germany"
2003 Architecture + Technology Award, for the project “Fraunhofer Institute for Solar Energy, Freiburg, Germany”
2002 Hans Bickel Prize, for overall work
1998 International Trend Prize, for the project "Kempinski Hotel Airport, Munich, Germany"

Projects 

Rainer Schmidt's work has been showcased in a number of publications, displaying a wide variety of built projects of residential gardens, historic museum landscapes, temporary garden exhibitions, parks, and open public spaces. Rainer Schmidt has been in collaboration with Architect Helmut Jahn on many projects over the previous years, including the landscapes of Munich Airport, Weser Tower, and Highlight Towers.

Built

Museum of Art, Mannheim, Germany (2018)
Allianz Campus, Munich, Germany (2016)
Redesign of the clinic of the Goethe University, Frankfurt, Germany (2016)
Campus University Applied Sciences in Derendorf, Düsseldorf, Germany (2015)
Weserquarter, Bremen, Germany (2014)
Doha Convention Center Tower, Doha, Qatar (2014)
Campus University of Applied Sciences, Bielefeld, Germany (2013)
Hans-Sachs-Haus, Gelsenkirchen, Germany (2013)
Pariser Yards, Stuttgart, Germany (2013)
Killesbergpark, Stuttgart, Germany (2013)
Think K, Stuttgart, Germany (2013)
Hotel Leonardo Royal, Munich, Germany (2012)
Villa Pienzenauerstraße, Munich, Germany (2012)
Future Park Killesberg, Stuttgart, Germany (2012)
Residences PANDION PRIME, Munich, Germany (2011)
Living Quarter Hirschgarten, Munich, Germany (2011)
Bavarian National Museum, Munich, Germany (2011)
Luxun Academy of Fine Arts, Dalian, China (2011)
Culture Wave City Hangzhou, China (2009)
Villen Cubuklu, Istanbul, Turkey (2008)
Villa Garden, St. Gilgen, Germany (Completed 2007)
Infineon Area, Munich, Germany (2006)
Federal Garden Exhibition BUGA, Munich, Germany (2005)

Under construction

Criminal Justice Center, Munich, Germany
Djamaâ el Djazaïr – Mosque of Algiers, Algiers, Algeria
Nelson-Mandela-Platz, Nuremberg, Germany
Inselhalle Lindau, Lindau, Germany

Publications (selection) 

Schmidt, Rainer (2017), „Innovationsräume – Gartenkunst und Natur“; in Jahrbuch 12 der DGGL, "Moderne Gartenkunst", Callwey, München
— (2014),"Neue Landschaftsarchitektur-Bühnen. Kernzellen für neue Erfahrungen von Natur"; in Jahrbuch 9 der DGGL „Zukunft Stadtgrün“, Callwey, München
— (2012), "Natur durch Kultur. Von der Romantik zur Organik; in Jahrbuch 7 der DGGl "Gartenkunst und Landschaftskultur – 125 Jahre DGGL“, Callwey, München
— (2009), "Die Bedeutung der Bilder in der Landschaftsarchitektur. Von der Landschaftsmalerei zur virtuellen Landschaft", in Jahrbuch 4 der DGGL „Garten und Medien“, Callwey, München
— (2008) “Landscape Architectural Proposal for Malta” for „Ministry for Infrastructure, Transport and Communications, Malta“ in “Digital Design in Landscape Architecture, Wichmann  Topic: Digitale Medien und Darstellung in der Landschaftsarchitektur
— (2008), „best private plots 08 – Die besten Gärten 2008“, in: ; Topic: Garden design Villa Garden St. Gilgen
— (2008), „Wake up to Tbilisi“, Guide of urban development of the town of Tbilisi, Georgia at Expo Real, Topic: Hotelkomplex GMT in Tbilisi, Georgia
— (2008), Landscape Design, China, Edition 28/2008, Topic: Ecological Development of parks, Case of Infineon, Munich
— (2008), „Garden Design“, Edition 02/2008  Topic: Bavarian National Museum, Buga 2005, Riem Park, Villa Krantz
— (2008), „New international Landscape“, Edition 06/2008,  Topic: Ecological Green Places, Campeon, Munich
— (2007),"Romantik im Freiraum zeitgemäß? Eine Antwort auf Rationalität und technischen Fortschritt", in Jahrbuch 2 der DGGL, „Gartenkunst im Städtebau“, Callwey, München
— (2005), “Luxury private Gardens”, teNeues, ; Topic: Villa Krantz, Villa garden *Schmidt, Rainer (2005), „Green Belt“ Modern Landscape Design, Topic: Parktown Schwabing, Campeon, Buga
— (2005), “Garden Design“, teNeues  Topic: Villa Garden St. Gilgen
— (2005), „100x900“, H.K. Rihan International Culture Spread, China ; Topic: Buga, Palacegarden Abu Dhabi, Hafencity Hamburg
— (2005), „Urban Landscape Design“, teNeues  Topic; Parktown Schwabing, Terminal 2 Munich
— (2005) Landscapearchitecture, TOPOS 2005, Callwey, München

References

External links 
 

1954 births
Living people
German landscape architects
People from Gelsenkirchen